Levon Ghulyan was an Armenian politician who served as Minister of Provisions of the First Republic of Armenia from 1918 to 1919.

In a letter to his wife, the first prime minister of Armenia, Hovhannes Kajaznuni, described Ghulyan as "practically intelligent, very resourceful and capable person, but unreliable", adding: "he pretends to be a strong Armenian, but really he has only one God, his own interest."

References 

People of the First Republic of Armenia
Ministers of Social Protection of the First Republic of Armenia